Oerlinghausen is a city in the Lippe district of North Rhine-Westphalia, Germany located between Bielefeld and Detmold in the Teutoburg Forest. It has c. 16,700 inhabitants (2013).

Geography
Geographically, Oerlinghausen is situated on top of the Teutoburger Forest hills. Oerlinghausen's highest point is the Tönsberg with 334 meters. The flatlands of northern Germany start some 40 km north of Oerlinghausen. There are hiking routes along the hill chain which stretches 80 km in east-west direction. To the south of the hills are large sand areas originating from melting glaciers during past ice ages. Although not high, the hills are steep in many places and almost completely covered by forest.

History and culture

First mentioned in documents in 1036, the town became a city in 1926 by authority of the Land of Lippe. In 1969 the city was expanded with the addition of Helpup, Währentrup and Lipperreihe as part of the "Gebietsreform" movement.

Oerlinghausen is home to an airfield which is one of Europe's largest gliding centres as well as the well known Archäologisches Freilichtmuseum Oerlinghausen (archaeological open-air museum) featuring reconstructions of a variety of dwellings spanning from 10,000 BC to 1000 AD.

The city has also been home to an unusual number of well-known sociologists. Marianne Weber (born Schnitger), who was born in Oerlinghausen and married Max Weber here in 1893, was a well-respected author herself. Niklas Luhmann and Richard Grathoff, two of the key sociologists who made the Bielefeld University one of the premier institutions for sociology in Europe, have also lived in Oerlinghausen for extended time periods.

Number of inhabitants

Mayors

Sons and daughters of the town
Marianne Weber (born Schnitger) (1870–1954), lawyer, sociologist and legal historian
Friedrich Bödeker (1867–1937), craftsman and cacti explorer
Berthold Müller-Oerlinghausen (1893–1979), sculptor
 Andreas Ortmann (born 1953), economist

References

External links

  
 Freilichtmuseum website 
 Glider Airfield Website 

Towns in North Rhine-Westphalia
Lippe
Principality of Lippe